The Ryan YO-51 Dragonfly was an observation aircraft designed and built by Ryan Aeronautical for the United States Army Air Corps (USAAC). A single-engined parasol wing monoplane, it was designed for optimum STOL capability, but although three prototypes proved highly successful in testing, the Stinson YO-49 was judged superior and no production contract was placed.

Design
The design of the YO-51 Dragonfly was typical for aircraft of its type, being optimised for the observation and liaison role, with emphasis on the ability to operate out of the smallest possible airfields. The Dragonfly was a high-wing braced parasol monoplane with fixed tailwheel landing gear, a two-seat open cockpit, and full-span slots and Fowler flaps for STOL capability. It was powered by a single Pratt & Whitney R-985-21 Wasp Junior radial engine.

At gross weight, the YO-51 could, without flaps, take off after a run of 400 feet, while with full flaps the takeoff run would be only 75 feet, or just four feet more than twice its own length.

Operational history
Nicknamed the "flying motorcycle", three YO-51 aircraft were acquired by the United States Army Air Corps to take part in a fly-off evaluation against the Stinson YO-49 and Bellanca YO-50 to supply a new observation and liaison aircraft for use by the USAAC. The YO-51 was the heaviest of the three aircraft evaluated.

Although the Dragonfly was considered satisfactory during its flight testing, conducted at Wright Field in Ohio, the Stinson machine won the production contract, and no further YO-51s were built.

Specifications

See also

References
Notes

Bibliography

External links

 O-51 Dragonfly at Dave's Warbirds

YO-51
1940s United States military reconnaissance aircraft
Single-engined tractor aircraft
Parasol-wing aircraft
Aircraft first flown in 1940